Pokémate (ポケメ～ト) is a Pokémon-themed application for NTT DoCoMo FOMA 900i series mobile phones developed by Square Enix. It was announced in April 2006 as a Pokémon-themed messaging application for release that Summer in Japan, and launched on June 5 as a full game surrounding a messaging system. The application allows players to care for Pokémon and communicate with friends. Pokémon must first be captured with Poké Balls, of which the player has a limited supply. The initial application was free, but to receive more Pokémates, Poké Balls, and other media, a monthly subscription price of 210 yen was required for the "formal service edition". The game was only released in Japan, and the service was discontinued a year and a half after release in January 2008. Beyond the initial announcement, the game drew little attention from both the Japanese and English-language press.

Gameplay

Unlike in other Pokémon games, the Pokémon in Pokémate are meant to be taken care of, similar to a virtual pet simulation; they do not level up or fight like a role-playing game. When the game is accessed for the first time, the player is given three random Pokémon and 10 Poké Balls with which to catch other Pokémon. Without a monthly subscription, the player can not catch any more Pokémon than the initial set of Poké Balls. The subscription grants the player five more Poké Balls, more available Pokémon to capture, and the option to purchase more Poké Balls for additional fees.

Chat and messaging application

The chat room application allows the user to chat with up to 16 friends respectively or send "Poketoku" voice mail to any other users. The "Hiroba" mail feature allows the player to send e-mails or messages to other users of the application. The messaging application only worked for the first month unless a subscription was purchased. Captured Pokémon can be displayed as the player's avatar when chatting with other users. The avatar's expression changes in reaction to messages.  The messaging feature was the primary point of Pokémate, which was marketed as a Pokémon-branded voice and text communication service between users rather than as a video game.

Development
Pokémate was announced by Square Enix on April 24, 2006, as a mobile communication application for NTT DoCoMo FOMA 900i series mobile phones, where Pokémon would live in the user's phone and let the user communicate with their family and friends as if via email. Pokémon were said to announce new messages in their own voice. The application was planned to be released with a monthly subscription fee that Summer in Japan. The application was launched on June 5, 2006, with a game surrounding the initially announced messaging application. It was showcased at the Tokyo Game Show in September 2006 along with a playable demo at the Square Enix lineup.  The interface was designed for easy use and was aimed towards elementary-school aged children.

The initial application was free, but to receive more Pokémate, Poké Balls, and other media, a monthly subscription price of 210 yen was required for the "formal service edition". The game was only released in Japan, and the service was discontinued a little over a year after release in January 2008.

References

External links
 Pokémate at Square Enix 
 Press release

2006 video games
Japan-exclusive video games
Mobile games
Square Enix games
Multiplayer and single-player video games
Video games developed in Japan
Pokémon spin-off games